The 1922 Vermont gubernatorial election took place on November 7, 1922. Incumbent Republican James Hartness, per the "Mountain Rule", did not run for re-election to a second term as Governor of Vermont. Republican candidate Redfield Proctor Jr. defeated Democratic candidate John Holmes Jackson to succeed him.

Republican primary

Results

Democratic primary

Results

General election

Results

References

Vermont
1922
Gubernatorial
November 1922 events